The Sixth Race (Spanish: La sexta carrera) is a 1953 Mexican drama film directed by Miguel M. Delgado and starring Rosario Granados. It is set in the world of horse racing.

Cast
 Amparo Arozamena 
 Manolo Fábregas 
 Rosario Granados 
 Prudencia Grifell 
 Wolf Ruvinskis 
 Andrés Soler 
 Fernando Soto 
 Manuel Sánchez Navarro

References

Bibliography 
 María Luisa Amador. Cartelera cinematográfica, 1950-1959. UNAM, 1985.

External links 
 

1953 films
1953 drama films
Mexican drama films
1950s Spanish-language films
Films directed by Miguel M. Delgado
Mexican horse racing films
Mexican black-and-white films
1950s Mexican films